Farebrother is a surname of English origin. Notable people with the surname include:

Bernard Farebrother (1846 - 1888), English organist
Ernest William Farebrother (died 1891), English architect
Michael Farebrother (1920 - 1987), English cricketer
Violet Farebrother (1888 - 1969), English actress

English-language surnames